C-TRAN or C-Tran refers to any of four different public transit systems in the United States:

C-TRAN (Georgia) in Clayton County, Georgia (Atlanta area)
C TRAN (New York) in Chemung County (Elmira)
C-TRAN (North Carolina) in Wake County, North Carolina (Research Triangle)
C-Tran (Washington) in Clark County, Washington (Vancouver)